The Oakland Buccaneers was an American soccer club based in Oakland, California that was a member of the American Soccer League.

Coached by Javier de la Torre, the Buccaneers changed their name midway through the 1976 season to the Golden Bay Buccaneers as they played most of their home games in Berkeley.

1976 Roster
 Franco Chirinos 18 Apps 7 Goals
 Gerald Hylkema 18 Apps 10 Goals
 Ed Rodie
Guy Oling, Defender, USA

Coaches
  Ricardo Ordonez

Year-by-year

External links
 Brief team overview
 The Year in American Soccer - 1976

Sports teams in Oakland, California
Defunct soccer clubs in California
Soccer clubs in California
American Soccer League (1933–1983) teams
1976 establishments in California
Association football clubs established in 1976
1976 disestablishments in California
Association football clubs disestablished in 1976
Sports in Berkeley, California